Petr Dmitrievich Dron (born 28 August 1985 in Saint Petersburg) is a Russian curler and curling coach. He lives in St. Petersburg. He competed at the 2013 World Curling Championships, and at the 2014 Winter Olympics in Sochi. He currently coaches the Russian men's junior team.

Career
Dron has been playing on curling competitions since 1996. He finished the Lesgaft National State University of Physical Education, Sport and Health. Nationally, Dron won the Federation Cup of Russia (2010–2011), and thrice the Russian Men's Curling Championship (2007, 2011, 2013). He was a member of the Russian team at the 2013 World Men's Curling Championship and at the European Curling Championships in 2012 and 2013. Dron won the 2010 World Mixed Doubles Curling Championship with Yana Nekrasova.

At the 2014 Olympic Games in Sochi, his team automatically qualified and became 7th there. In 2016, Dron and Victoria Moiseeva won the Latvian Mixed Doubles Curling Cup, defeating Spaniards Otaegi / Unanue.

References

External links

1985 births
Living people
Curlers from Saint Petersburg
Curlers at the 2014 Winter Olympics
Russian male curlers
Olympic curlers of Russia
Russian curling champions
World mixed doubles curling champions
Russian curling coaches
Lesgaft National State University of Physical Education, Sport and Health alumni